Keith Bryen (29 May 1927 – 22 October 2013) was a Grand Prix motorcycle road racer from Australia. His best season was in 1957 when he finished fourth in the 350cc world championship.

References 

Australian motorcycle racers
350cc World Championship riders
500cc World Championship riders
1927 births
2013 deaths